The 1888 Chicago White Stockings season was the 17th season of the Chicago White Stockings franchise, the 13th in the National League and the 4th at the first West Side Park. The White Stockings finished second in the National League with a record of 77–58, 9 games behind the New York Giants.

Regular season

Season standings

Record vs. opponents

Roster

Player stats

Batting

Starters by position 
Note: Pos = Position; G = Games played; AB = At bats; H = Hits; Avg. = Batting average; HR = Home runs; RBI = Runs batted in

Other batters 
Note: G = Games played; AB = At bats; H = Hits; Avg. = Batting average; HR = Home runs; RBI = Runs batted in

Pitching

Starting pitchers 
Note: G = Games pitched; IP = Innings pitched; W = Wins; L = Losses; ERA = Earned run average; SO = Strikeouts

Other pitchers 
Note: G = Games pitched; IP = Innings pitched; W = Wins; L = Losses; ERA = Earned run average; SO = Strikeouts

References 
1888 Chicago White Stockings season at Baseball Reference

Chicago Cubs seasons
Chicago White Stockings season
Chicago Cubs